NGC 245 is a spiral galaxy located in the constellation Cetus. It was discovered on October 1, 1785 by William Herschel.

References

External links
 

0245
Spiral galaxies
Cetus (constellation)
002691